The Art of Getting By is a 2011 American romantic comedy-drama film starring Freddie Highmore, Emma Roberts, Michael Angarano, Elizabeth Reaser, Sam Robards, Rita Wilson and Blair Underwood. It is the first feature by writer-director Gavin Wiesen. The film premiered under the title Homework at the 2011 Sundance Film Festival.

Plot
George is a loner high school student with a penchant for drawing and skipping class. He has a nihilistic view of the world which is why he never does homework and skips school frequently. His academic delinquency puts him on academic probation.

One day while on the school roof he encounters another classmate, Sally, smoking. When a teacher appears, George pulls out a cigarette and takes the fall for Sally. They become friends.

On career day, George meets young artist, Dustin, finding him inspiring. He brings Sally with him to visit Dustin at his studio in Brooklyn and it becomes apparent that Dustin finds Sally attractive. She invites George to a New Year's Eve party where she dances with an ex-boyfriend and George gets drunk, goes outside, throws up, and falls asleep in an alley. Finding him there, she takes him to her place, putting him to bed on a pull-out next to her bed. They grow close and George gets more involved in school.

On Valentine's Day, they go out to dinner and Sally starts asking questions about what he thinks of her. George is evasive, and she asks him if he'll have sex with her. George freezes. Sally backtracks and claims she was kidding. He remains withdrawn and leaves early. He refuses to take Sally's calls and avoids her. One day Sally runs into Dustin in the street and after a while the two of them start a relationship. George, troubled by this, stops doing homework and is again sent to the principal's office.

The principal gives George two choices: be expelled, or make up all of the work he has missed all year. Confronted by his mother and stepfather at home, he responds by telling his mother that his stepfather has been lying about work. The stepfather attacks him and George knocks him down before taking off. He goes to Sally's and, in the hallway, kisses her. Sally kisses back but breaks away as Dustin is in her apartment. Angry and hurt, George leaves.

The next morning, George finds his mother in the park and she tells him she's divorcing his stepfather. Consoling her, he begins to rethink his life. He decides to make the effort to do his assignments. His art teacher tells him he wants only one project, but that it must be honest and real. George works on his backwork and takes his final exams. Meanwhile, Sally continues seeing Dustin.

One day George gets a message from Sally. They meet and she tells him she's going backpacking with Dustin through Europe and skipping graduation. He tells her he's in love with her and they go back to her apartment, where they kiss. She tells him she loves him too and promises they'll be together one day. George turns in all his assignments and the principal tells him he'll know he's passed if his name is called at graduation. George's art teacher applauds him on his project.

At graduation, George is with Sally's friends with his mother in the audience. Sally is at the airport with Dustin. George's name is called and his mother applauds. Afterwards George is in the art classroom looking at his art project, the portrait of Sally. She walks in, joining him looking at the painting as the film closes.

Cast

Production
The film’s story is inspired by Gavin Wiesen’s childhood growing up in New York and spending summers in East Hampton. Wiesen finished writing the script in 2006 and secured a producer in 2008, with financing for the film taking another year to come together.

The film was shot in New York City in the spring of 2010, wrapping up that April.

Soundtrack
The music from the film was released by Rhino Records on June 14 as a CD soundtrack with 12 tracks.
Track Listing
 "We Will Become Silhouettes" - The Shins
 "We Drink on the Job" - Earlimart
 "Sally's Theme" - Alec Puro
 "Sleep The Clock Around" - Mates of State
 "This Momentary" - Delphic
 "Christmas Break" - Alec Puro
 "Winter Lady" - Leonard Cohen
 "The Skin of My Yellow Country Teeth" - Clap Your Hands Say Yeah
 "Sally's Bedroom" - Alec Puro
 "Spitting Fire" - The Boxer Rebellion
 "Here" - Pavement
 "The Trial of the Century" - French Kicks

Release
The film had its world premiere at the 2011 Sundance Film Festival on January 23, 2011. It received a limited release in American theaters on June 17, 2011. The movie was released on Blu-ray on November 29, 2011.

Reception

Box office
The Art of Getting By grossed $1.4 million in the United States and Canada, and $0.6 million in other territories, for a total of $2 million, against a production budget of $4 million.

Critical response
The site's consensus states: "A sitcom-level twee mess that bakes in the typical manic pixie dream girl and boring, withdrawn boy hero." At Metacritic, which assigns a rating out of 100 to reviews from mainstream critics, the film received a score of 36% based on 28 reviews, which indicates "generally unfavorable reviews". The film was criticized as being "a typical coming of age drama." Criticism also centered on the writing, though actor Freddie Highmore and his co-star Emma Roberts were both praised for their performances. Edward Douglas of ComingSoon.net noted, "A New York City boy-meets-girl story may be something we've seen many times before... but Wiesen brings something unique to the mix."

Awards and accolades

References

External links
 
 
 

2011 films
2010s English-language films
2010s coming-of-age comedy-drama films
2010s high school films
2010s teen comedy-drama films
2010s teen romance films
2011 directorial debut films
2011 independent films
2011 romantic comedy-drama films
American coming-of-age comedy-drama films
American high school films
American romantic comedy-drama films
American teen comedy-drama films
American teen romance films
Coming-of-age romance films
Films set in New York City
Films shot in New York City
Fox Searchlight Pictures films
2010s American films